

Teesha is a Sri Lankan military dog belonging to the country's Commando Regiment K-9 unit. She is a golden retriever, and was the first Sri Lankan dog to complete a high-altitude parachute jump on 21 November 2015, with Major Sujith Siranjeewa of the same regiment.

Military career
Teesha performed her duties as an explosive search dog for the 4th Commando Regiment during the country's civil war, helping track down enemy troops and explosives. She was, at a time, handled by Major Sujith Siranjeewa when he was Chief Instructor, Paratrooper Wing.

Parachuting record
Teesha's jump was first mooted by Major Siranjeewa, a veteran Sri Lankan parachutist and part of the Commando Regiment's paratrooper complement. The request was initially considered for denial by the Army and Defence establishment over concerns that the dog's life was being put in danger, with possible injuries resulting from such action. Permission was eventually granted, and Siranjeewa and Teesha performed a rehearsal jump sometime before 21 November 2015 with no problems. 

The actual jump was performed on 21 November at the Uva-Kudaoya Commando Training Camp grounds, as part of a tattoo in the passing out parade of 396 fresh Commando officers and troops.

The jump also earned Siranjeewa an Asian parachuting record.

See also
Snowy (Military dog)

References

External links
Images and video footage of the parachute jump

Detection dogs
Dogs in warfare
Individual dogs
Military animals
Sri Lankan military animals